Jason Weston (born 11 January 1971 in Portsmouth) is an English former professional snooker player. He competed on the main tour between 1991 and 1997 and intermittently until 2003, at one point being ranked the world number 90.

After successfully entering Q School in 2015, Weston regained his professional status for the 2015–16 season after a twelve-year absence.

Career
Weston, first turned professional at the start of the 1991–92 season, in a season which he reached the semi-final of the Benson & Hedges Satellite Championship, losing to future World Champion Ken Doherty, an event which the winner gain entry as a wildcard to the Masters. Weston qualified for the 1992 British Open in Derby, losing to Eddie Charlton in the last 32. However he then struggled to match these season and had an on-off career on the main tour, before ending to his career in 2003 after suffering from chronic fatigue syndrome.

During the 2014–15 season Weston returned to competition snooker at the pro-am 2015 Gdynia Open.  

In May 2015, Weston entered in the two Q School events of which eight two-year professional tour cards were on offer. Weston was successful in the second event with wins over Corey Deuel, Owais Ali, Simon Dent, Matthew Day, Joe Roberts and Kuldesh Johal 4–2 in the quarter final ensured his place of the World Snooker Tour for the 2015–16 and 2016–17 seasons. Weston only won 4 matches (including one walkover) during the 2015/16 season, all at the minor-ranking European Tour events. The following season was even worse, as his only win came at the single-frame Shoot-Out event. As a result, Weston was relegated from the tour.

Performance and rankings timeline

References

External links

 Jason Weston at CueTracker.net: Snooker Results and Statistic Database
Jason Weston at worldsnooker.com

English snooker players
Sportspeople from Portsmouth
Living people
1971 births